The 2012 Monte-Carlo Rolex Masters was a men's tennis tournament for male professional players, played from 16 April through 22 April 2012, on outdoor clay courts. It was the 106th edition of the annual Monte Carlo Masters tournament, which was sponsored by Rolex for the fourth time. It took place at the Monte Carlo Country Club in Roquebrune-Cap-Martin, France, near Monte Carlo, Monaco. Second-seeded Rafael Nadal won the singles title.

Points and prize money

Points
Because the Monte Carlo Masters is the non-mandatory Masters 1000 event, special rules regarding points distribution are in place. The Monte Carlo Masters counts as one of a player's 500 level tournaments, while distributing Masters 1000 points.

Prize money

Singles main draw entrants

Seeds

Rankings and seedings are as of April 9, 2012

Other entrants
The following players received wildcards into the main draw:
  Benjamin Balleret
  Jean-René Lisnard
  Paul-Henri Mathieu
  Potito Starace

The following players received entry via qualifying:
  Simone Bolelli
  Federico Delbonis
  Alessandro Giannessi
  Frederico Gil
  Victor Hănescu
  Mikhail Kukushkin
  Guillaume Rufin

Withdrawals
  Richard Gasquet (shoulder injury) 
  John Isner
  Gaël Monfils (side strain)

Retirements
  Julien Benneteau (right ankle injury)
  Carlos Berlocq (left calf injury)
  Juan Mónaco (right ankle injury)

Doubles main draw entrants

Seeds

 Rankings are as of April 9, 2012

Other entrants
The following pairs received wildcards into the doubles main draw:
  Simone Bolelli /  Fabio Fognini
  Arnaud Clément /  Jean-René Lisnard

The following pairs received entry as alternates:
  Marin Čilić /  Marcelo Melo
  Édouard Roger-Vasselin /  Gilles Simon

Withdrawals
  Colin Fleming
  Juan Mónaco (right ankle injury)

Finals

Singles

 Rafael Nadal defeated  Novak Djokovic, 6–3, 6–1
 It was Nadal's first title of the year and the 47th of his career.

Doubles

 Bob Bryan /  Mike Bryan defeated  Max Mirnyi /  Daniel Nestor, 6–2, 6–3

References

External links
 
 Association of Tennis Professionals (ATP) tournament profile

 
Monte-Carlo Rolex Masters
2012 in Monégasque sport
Monte-Carlo Masters
Monte